The Parus Business Centre is a 34-story class-A office building in Kyiv, the capital of Ukraine. It is located at the very centre of the city, between Mechnikova St. and Lesi Ukrainky Blvd. (municipal address: 2, Mechnikova St.).

At its opening in 2007 the Parus Business Centre was the highest building it the country, as of 2018 it remains the third highest.

Construction of the building began in 2004, and ended in February 2007.

While still on the construction stage, the project was also known as "Elsburg Plaza", but was later renamed to "Parus" (literally translated as "sail")  ostensibly because of building's oval-like shape, resembling sail of a ship.

In July 2008, Kontrakty, Ukrainian business weekly, rated top 10 most expensive offices in Kyiv. Parus was top of the chart in terms of annual rental income, which stood at some $50 million.

Major tenants at Parus include McKinsey & Company, Concorde Capital, an investment bank; TNK-BP, an oil company; Olimp, Ukrainian spirits company; Delin Development, a real estate development company; Interpipe, steel pipes producer and others. Colliers International, a commercial real estate services company, was an exclusive leasing agent for Parus.

Parus was developed and is owned by "Mandaryn Plaza Ltd.", a joint-stock company, prominent for its homonymous high-end shopping center in the center of Kyiv. From 2007 to 2016 the building was owned by Ukrainian businessman, Dmytro Firtash.

Gallery

See also
 List of tallest buildings in Europe

Notes

a. 
The figure is the total area of ground floors only. The total gross building area (GBA) of Parus, including underground parking garage comes to ca. 75,000 sqm (ca. 807,300 sqf).

References

External links
 Parus Business Center home page 

Buildings and structures in Kyiv
Skyscrapers in Ukraine
Buildings and structures completed in 2007
Office buildings in Kyiv
Pecherskyi District
Skyscraper office buildings